Montclair College Preparatory School, also commonly known as "Montclair Prep", was a school located in Van Nuys, Los Angeles, California, near Panorama City. The school taught grades 6 through 12, and later grades 9-12 only.

History
Founded in 1956 by the late Vernon E. Simpson, Montclair College Preparatory School was one of the oldest private, co-educational, independent, secondary schools in the San Fernando Valley. A rigorous, traditional college preparatory education was offered to students in grades six through twelve.

The school was governed by a board of directors which set the overall direction of the school. Montclair Prep maintained faculty academic advisement and standards committees that worked with the administration to maintain the highest caliber of academics and to provide a small group of social, athletic, and cultural extracurricular activities for its students.

In May 2011, Gazi Kabir, a social studies teacher, was arrested for having sex with a 15-year-old student on multiple occasions. He was previously accused of child annoyance in 2007, and his teaching certificate had been suspended for misconduct for two weeks by the California Commission on Teacher Credentialing.

During the 2000s the school's American football team saw increasingly little participation, and switched to eight-man football. In July 2011, Montclair announced that it was dropping all athletic programs, as well as the middle school portion of the school. In addition, seventy percent of the faculty was laid off. In the summer of 2012, Montclair announced its closure effective July 15.

Activities
Publications by students include Junior Statesman of America, the school's yearbook; its middle school Montclairion newspaper; the Montclair Journal; Scientifically Speaking, a science-oriented publication; and Wings, the school's  literary magazine.

Notable alumni

Arts and entertainment

Sports

References

External links

High schools in Los Angeles
High schools in the San Fernando Valley
Defunct schools in California
Private schools in California
Sepulveda Boulevard
Panorama City, Los Angeles
Van Nuys, Los Angeles
Private middle schools in California
Private high schools in California
1956 establishments in California
2012 disestablishments in California
Educational institutions established in 1956
Educational institutions disestablished in 2012